The Civil Code of the Republic of Korea (South Korea) was passed in 1958 as Law No. 471 and is known in South Korea as one of the three fundamental laws, the other two being Criminal law and constitution. It is made up of five parts, Part I (general provisions), Part II (real rights), Part III (claims), Part IV (relatives), and Part V (inheritance).

History
The South Korean Civil Code is the largest code among South Korean law. During the period of Japanese rule (1910-1945), Japanese civil code was used, but family law and succession law partially followed Korean customary rules. After the establishment of the South Korean government, the Committee of Law Compilation (법률편찬위원회) proceed to legislate civil code and other codes in 1948 and completed in 1953. The South Korean government supplied the draft to the legislature in 1954, which then passed the civil code into law in 1957 after some amendments, mostly relating to the family law.

After it was enacted, the South Korean civil code has been modified seven times. Especially in family law, patriarchal system of family law was abolished in order to achieve the equality of the sexes in 1990. For example, in the area of child custody, both parents came to have equal rights, and the household registration system (호주제,  hojuje) was abolished as unconstitutional.

Contents

Part 1: general provisions.
General provisions (민법총칙) is a basic principle applying to the substantive law, according to the "Pandekten system". In the section of source of law, customary law and sound reasoning are also considered as source of law (Article 1). "Trust and good faith rule" is also stated in article 2.

General provisions consists of seven chapters:

 Common provisions (source of law)
 Persons
 capacity
 domicile
 absence and disappearance
 Juristic persons
 incorporation
 organization
 dissolution
 penal provisions
 Things 
 Juristic acts
 general provision
 declaration of intention
 agency
 nullity and voidance
 conditions and time
 Period
 Extinctive prescription

Part 2: property rights
Property rights (물권법) are influenced by Roman law and German law, but the "right to registered lease on deposit basis" (chonsegwon) has the most strong indigenous features. According to article 303, any  person having chonsegwon is entitled to use it in conformity with its purposes and to take the profits from it by paying the deposit money and possessing the real property owned by another person.

In customary rule, customary superficies, right of grave base are also applied except nine rights written in the real rights part. In real estate, effect of changes in real rights is only valid by registration. This is because the rights and relations of real estate can be clear by the registration which serves the security of real estate contract.

Real rights consists of General Provisions (chapters 1 - 3) and Servitude (chapters 4 - 7):

 Possessory right 
 Ownership (limitation of ownership, acquisition of ownership, joint ownership) 
 Superficies
 Right to registered lease on deposit basis, ‘Chonsegwon’,
 Right of retention,
 Pledge
 pledge of movables
 pledge of rights
 Mortgage

Part 3: claims
Claims (채권법) consists of contract, management of affairs, unjust enrichment and tort. Contract part covers formation of contract, offer and acceptance and the kinds of contracts, gift sale and exchange, etc. In tort part, torts and damages are defined. Korean definition of torts is stated in article 750; "any person who causes losses to or inflicts injuries on another person by an unlawful act, willfully or negligently shall be bound to make compensation for damages arising therefrom".

Claims part consists of five chapters:

 General provisions
 subject of claim
 effect of claim
 several obliges and obligors
 assignment of claim
 assumption of obligation
 extinction of claim
 debts and payable order
 debts payable to bearer
 Contract
 general provisions
 gift
 sale
 effect of sale
 contract of exchange
 loan for consumption
 lease
 contract of employment
 contract for work
 advertisement for prize contest
 mandate
 bailment
 partnership
 life annuity
 compromise
 Management of affairs
 Unjust enrichment
 Torts

Part 4: relatives
In South Korean law, the law on relatives (친족법) and (상속법) inheritance law comprise what is usually referred to as "family law" in legal studies. The law on relatives define marriage, parents and children, adoption, and the like. The Head of family system (호주제도, hojujedo) which gives benefit to the male member of family influenced the most part of South Korean family law before it was abolished by the Constitutional Court in 2005, because it was found to be against equality of sexes and human dignity. Therefore, in 2005, the modified civil code was enacted.

 General provision
 Scope of family members and surname and origin of surname of child
 Marriage
 matrimonial engagement
 formation of marriage
 nullity and annulment of marriage
 effect of marriage
 divorce
 Parents and children
 children of natural parent
 adoption
 parental authority
 Guardianship
 duties of guardianship
 termination of guardianship
 Family council 
 Support

Part 5. Inheritance
Inheritance
 general provisions
 inheritor
 effects of inheritance
 acceptance and renunciation of inheritance
 separation of property
 absence of inheritor
 Wills
 general provisions
 forms of wills
 effect of wills
 execution of wills
 withdrawal of wills
 Legal reserve of inheritance

References

External links
네이버 백과사전
All English terms used here are from the  Ministry of Justice, Republic of Korea

Law of South Korea
South Korea